Hewsang was a  cargo ship which was built by William Gray & Co Ltd, West Hartlepool in 1944 as  Empire Bermuda for the Ministry of War Transport (MoWT). Postwar she was sold into merchant service and renamed Hewsang and later sold to new owners and renamed Sunshine, serving until scrapped in 1970.

Description
Empire Bermuda was built by William Gray & Co Ltd, West Hartlepool. She  was yard number 1173 and was launched on 30 September 1944 with completion in November. Her GRT was 3,359, with a NRT of 2,257.

Career
Empire Bermuda was placed under the management of the Joseph Constantine Steamship Line by the MoWT. In 1949, she was sold to the Indo-China Steam Navigation Co Ltd, London and renamed Hewsang. In 1963, Hewsang was sold to the Sunshine Navigation Co Ltd, Panama and renamed Sunshine. She was placed under the management of Patt Manfield & Co Ltd, Hong Kong. The ship was scrapped at Kaohsiung, Taiwan in March 1970.

Official Numbers and Code Letters

Official Numbers were a forerunner to IMO Numbers. Empire Bermuda had the UK Official Number 180078 and the Code Letters GDMP.

Propulsion

It was built by the Central Marine Engineering Works, West Hartlepool.

References

1944 ships
Ships built on the River Tees
Ministry of War Transport ships
Empire ships
Steamships of the United Kingdom
Merchant ships of the United Kingdom
Steamships of Panama
Merchant ships of Panama